1,4,7-Trithiacyclononane, also called 9-ane-S3, is the thia-crown ether with the formula (CH2CH2S)3.  This cyclic thioether is most often encountered as a tridentate ligand in coordination chemistry, where it forms transition metal thioether complexes.

9-ane-S3 forms complexes with many metal ions, including those considered hard, such as copper(II) and iron(II).  Most of its complexes have the formula [M(9-ane-S3)2]2+ and are octahedral. The point group of [M(9-ane-S3)2]2+ is S6.

Synthesis
This compound was first reported in 1977, and the current synthesis entails the assembly within the coordination sphere of a metal ion followed by decomplexation:

References

Chelating agents
Sulfur heterocycles
Thioethers
Macrocycles